Long Beach, California, held an election for Mayor of Long Beach, California, on April 13, 2010. It saw the reelection of Bob Foster.

Municipal elections in California are officially non-partisan.

Results

References 

Long Beach
Mayoral elections in Long Beach, California
Long Beach